Thuận An is a ward of Huế city in Thừa Thiên Huế Province, Vietnam. As of 2020, the ward covers area of 16.28 km² with population of 20,972 and population density of 1,288 citizens/km².

Formerly a township of Phú Vang district, Thuận An was incorporated by Huế in 2021 and became a ward of the city ever since.

References 

Populated places in Thừa Thiên Huế province